Indiana District is one of thirteen districts of the Maynas Province in Peru.

References

Districts of the Maynas Province
Districts of the Loreto Region
1961 establishments in Peru
States and territories established in 1961